The 2001–02 League of Ireland First Division season was the 17th season of the League of Ireland First Division.

Overview
The First Division was contested by 10 teams and Drogheda United won the division. The 2002–03 season would see the League of Ireland First Division expanded from 10 to 12 teams. As a result, the runners-up, Finn Harps F.C. were not automatically promoted as in previous seasons.

Final table

Promotion/relegation play-off
Second placed Finn Harps played off against Longford Town who finished in ninth place in the 2001–02 League of Ireland Premier Division. The winner would compete in the 2002–03 League of Ireland Premier Division.

1st Leg

2nd Leg 

Longford Town win 6-5  on penalties after extra time and retain their place in the Premier Division.

See also
 2001–02 League of Ireland Premier Division

References

League of Ireland First Division seasons
2001–02 in Republic of Ireland association football
Ireland